A Lorette is a type of 19th-century French prostitute. They stood between the kept women (courtesans) and the grisettes. A grisette had other employment and worked part-time as a prostitute whereas a Lorette supported herself exclusively from prostitution. The lorette shared her favours among several lovers; the Lorette's "Arthurs", as they called them, were not financially able or too fickle to have exclusivity.

The lorettes evolved into coquettes under the Second French Empire and grues by the First World War.

Origin of the name
The neologism first appeared during the July monarchy (1830-1848). The name derives from the Notre-Dame-de-Lorette, one of the churches located around the old Breda street (hence their other name of brédas), part of the area of prostitution in the subdivision of Nouvelle Athènes, located in the current 9th arrondissement of Paris It was in this district that they resided for the most part at the time of Louis-Philippe.

In literature

Nestor Roqueplan, the Goncourt brothers, Paul de Kock, Alexandre Dumas fils, and Henri Murger often found inspiration from these frivolous and naive demi-mondaine women. Gustave Doré engraved them in their glory and decay. Nana, by Émile Zola, describes the life and the tragic destiny of one of these lorettes.

Balzac was the subject of vehement critiques for his iniquitous treatment of prostitutes through Coralie, heroine of Illusions perdues, Esther, heroine of Splendeurs et misères des courtisanes and in Le Père Goriot. Balzac also included lorettes in Types de personnages de la Comédie humaine.

Grandville produced many illustrations of lorettes, 79 of which were published in Le Charivari during the early 1840s. He also published collections such as "les partageeuses" and "les lorettes vieillies".

References

Bibliography
 
 
 
 
 
 
 
 
 

Prostitution in France
Prostitutes by type